Veliko Tarnovo Municipality is a municipality (obshtina) in Veliko Tarnovo Province, Central-North Bulgaria, located mostly in the so-called Fore-Balkan area north of Stara planina mountain. It is named after its administrative centre - the old capital of the country, the city of Veliko Tarnovo which is also the main town of the province.

The area is a crossroads of two of the major transport corridors in Bulgaria - road E772 which connects the capital of Sofia with the port of Varna and road E85 which connects the city of Ruse on Danube river with Shipka pass. The Hemus motorway is planned to cross the municipality north of its main town.

Settlements 

(towns are shown in bold): Population (December 2009)

 Veliko Tarnovo - Велико Търново - 67,099
 Arbanasi - Арбанаси -
 Balvan - Балван -
 Belyakovets - Беляковец -
 Bizhovtsi - Бижовци -
 Boychevi Kolibi - Бойчеви колиби -
 Boychovtsi - Бойчовци -
 Bochkovtsi - Бочковци -
 Boyanovtsi - Бояновци -
 Bukovets - Буковец -
 Debelets - Дебелец -
 Devetatsite - Деветаците -
 Dechkovtsi - Дечковци -
 Dimitrovtsi - Димитровци -
 Dimovtsi - Димовци -
 Dichin - Дичин -
 Dolen Enevets - Долен Еневец -
 Dolni Damyanovtsi - Долни Дамяновци -
 Dunavtsi - Дунавци -
 Emen - Емен -
 Gabrovtsi - Габровци -
 Gashtevtsi - Гащевци -
 Golemanite - Големаните -
 Goranovtsi - Горановци -
 Goren Enevets - Горен Еневец -
 Hotnitsa - Хотница -
 Ivanovtsi - Ивановци -
 Ilevtsi - Илевци -
 Kapinovo - Къпиново -
 Kilifarevo - Килифарево -
 Kisyovtsi - Кисьовци -
 Kladni Dyal - Кладни дял -
 Klashka Reka - Клъшка река -
 Lagerite - Лагерите -
 Ledenik - Леденик -
 Malki Chiflik - Малки Чифлик -
 Malchovtsi - Малчовци -
 Mindya - Миндя -
 Mishemorkov Han - Мишеморков хан -
 Momin Sbor - Момин сбор -
 Natsovtsi - Нацовци -
 Nikyup - Никюп -
 Novo Selo - Ново село -
 Piramidata - Пирамидата -
 Plakovo - Плаково -
 Pozhernik - Пожерник -
 Popovtsi - Поповци -
 Prisovo - Присово -
 Prodanovtsi - Продановци -
 Pushevo - Пушево -
 Pchelishte - Пчелище -
 Parovtsi - Пъровци -
 Radkovtsi - Радковци -
 Raykovtsi - Райковци -
 Resen - Ресен -
 Rusalya - Русаля -
 Samovodene - Самоводене -
 Samsiite - Самсиите -
 Seymenite - Сеймените -
 Semkovtsi - Семковци -
 Suha Reka - Суха река -
 Sarnentsi - Сърненци -
 Sheremetya - Шереметя -
 Shodekovtsi - Шодековци -
 Shemshevo - Шемшево -
 Terziite - Терзиите -
 Todorovtsi - Тодоровци -
 Tserova Koriya - Церова кория -
 Velchevo - Велчево -
 Vetrintsi - Ветринци -
 Vilare - Виларе -
 Vodoley - Водолей -
 Voynezha - Войнежа -
 Voneshta Voda - Вонеща вода -
 Vaglevtsi - Въглевци -
 Varlinka - Върлинка -
 Yalovo - Ялово -
 Yovchebtsi - Йовчевци -

Demography 
The following table shows the change of the population during the last four decades. Since 1992 Veliko Tarnovo Municipality has comprised the former municipality of Kilifarevo and the numbers in the table reflect this unification.

Ethnic composition
According to the 2011 census, among those who answered the optional question on ethnic identification, the ethnic composition of the municipality was the following:

Religion
According to the latest Bulgarian census of 2011, the religious composition, among those who answered the optional question on religious identification, was the following:

An overwhelming majority of the population of Veliko Tarnovo Municipality identify themselves as Christians. At the 2011 census, 83.8% of respondents identified as Orthodox Christians belonging to the Bulgarian Orthodox Church.

See also
Provinces of Bulgaria
Municipalities of Bulgaria
List of cities and towns in Bulgaria

References

External links
 Official website 

Municipalities in Veliko Tarnovo Province